Indri Hapsari Soeharto (born 20 November 1960) is an Indonesian actress, psychiatrist, pasindhèn singer, model and beauty pageant winner who won the title Putri Indonesia 1997 (Miss International Indonesia 1977). She represented Indonesia at the Miss International 1977 in Japan, where she was placed 2nd runner-up. After Tresyee Ratri Nugraheni Astuti, who previously placed in the top 15 at the Miss International for the first time in 1976, Soeharto became the second Indonesian in history to be a Miss International finalists.

Early Life and Education
Born in Jakarta - Indonesia on 20 November 1960 to a Betawis-Javanese parents. Soeharto holds a Master's degree in Clinical Child Psychology and Psychiatry from the University of Indonesia, Jakarta, Indonesia

Pageantry

Putri Indonesia 1977
In 1977, Soeharto participated in Putri Indonesia 1977 national pageant and eventually won the title to representing Indonesia at Miss International 1977. Soeharto is the last Indonesian representative to enter a Miss International beauty pageant before inactive from 1978 to 2007, where Indonesia finally return and represented by Rahma Landy Sjahruddin of the Puteri Indonesia organization.
Soeharto was crowned by the outgoing champion of Putri Indonesia 1976 and Miss International Indonesia 1976, Tresyee Ratri Nugraheni Astuti of Central Java, at the finale coronation night of the event at Taman Mini Indonesia Indah in Jakarta.

Miss International 1977
As Putri Indonesia 1977, at the age of seventeen, Soeharto represented Indonesia in the 17th edition of Miss International beauty pageant. The final was held on July 1, 1977, at the Imperial Garden Theater in Tokyo, Japan where Soeharto placed as the 2nd Runner-up, Sophie Perin from France crowned her successor Pilar Medina from Spain at the end of the event.

Soeharto 2nd runner-up finish in Miss International 1977 and Linda Emran Abiprajadi as the winner of Miss Asia Pacific International 1977 completed Indonesia's success in beauty pageant history. 39 years later, Felicia Hwang Yi Xin repeated Soeharto's achievement by finishing as the 2nd runner-up in the respective Miss International 2016 beauty pageant.

Filmography
After returning to Indonesia, a year later, Soeharto received an offer to acting in a film directed by Umar Kayam called "Bulu-Bulu Cendrawasih". Soeharto is quite proud of herself as she has the chance to work with a number of famous actors and actresses like Rima Melati, Jajang C. Noer, Farouk Afero, Titi Qadarsih, Rahadian Yamin and Rina Hasyim at a very young age. This film tells the story of an immigrant child who is looking for his fortune to become a model. Since then, Soeharto has acted in several film and television films in Indonesia.

Movies

TV Appearances

See also
Puteri Indonesia
Miss International
Miss International 1977
Rahma Landy Sjahruddin
Tresyee Ratri Nugraheni Astuti

References

External links

 Puteri Indonesia Official Website
 Miss International Official Website

Living people
1960 births
Puteri Indonesia winners
Miss International 1977 delegates
University of Indonesia alumni
Alumni of the University of Sheffield
Mental health activists
Indonesian beauty pageant winners
Indonesian female models
Indonesian stage actresses
Indonesian film actresses
Indonesian television actresses
Indonesian Christians
Actresses from Jakarta
Javanese people
Betawi people
People from Jakarta